This is a list of Danish television related events from 2002.

Events
9 February - Malene Mortensen is selected to represent Denmark at the 2002 Eurovision Song Contest with her song "Vis mig hvem du er". She is selected to be the thirty-first Danish Eurovision entry during Dansk Melodi Grand Prix held at the Circus Building in Copenhagen.
6 December - Carsten B. Berthelsen wins the second season of Big Brother.

Debuts

Television shows

1990s
Hvem vil være millionær? (1999–present)

2000s
Big Brother (2001-2005, 2012-2014)

Ending this year

Births

Deaths

See also
 2002 in Denmark